Walter Hauser (born 23 September 1943) is a Swiss weightlifter. He competed in the men's light heavyweight event at the 1972 Summer Olympics.

References

1943 births
Living people
Swiss male weightlifters
Olympic weightlifters of Switzerland
Weightlifters at the 1972 Summer Olympics
Place of birth missing (living people)